Uli Grötsch (born 14 July 1975) is a German politician of the Social Democratic Party (SPD) who has been serving as a member of the Bundestag from the state of Bavaria since 2013.

Political career 
Grötsch first became a member of the Bundestag in the 2013 German federal election. He is a member of the Committee on Home Affairs. In 2014, he also joined the Parliamentary Oversight Panel (PKGr), which provides parliamentary oversight of Germany's intelligence services BND, BfV and MAD.

Since 2018, Grötsch has been part of a cross-party working group on a reform of Germany’s electoral system, chaired by Wolfgang Schäuble.

In early 2021, Grötsch was chosen to lead his party's campaign for the national elections. Shortly after, he lost a vote to succeed Natascha Kohnen as chair of the SPD in Bavaria.

Other activities 
 Business Forum of the Social Democratic Party of Germany, Member of the Political Advisory Board (since 2020)
 Federal Agency for Civic Education (BPB), Member of the Board of Trustees
 Trade Union of the Police (GdP), Member
 Gegen Vergessen – Für Demokratie, Member

References

External links 

  
 Bundestag biography 

1975 births
Living people
Members of the Bundestag for Bavaria
Members of the Bundestag 2021–2025
Members of the Bundestag 2017–2021
Members of the Bundestag 2013–2017
Members of the Bundestag for the Social Democratic Party of Germany
People from Weiden in der Oberpfalz